Uroš Pavlovčič (born 20 February 1972 in Jesenice) is a Slovenian former alpine skier who competed in the 2002 Winter Olympics.

World Cup results

Season standings

Race podiums

External links
 sports-reference.com

1972 births
Living people
Slovenian male alpine skiers
Olympic alpine skiers of Slovenia
Alpine skiers at the 2002 Winter Olympics
Sportspeople from Jesenice, Jesenice
Universiade medalists in alpine skiing
Universiade gold medalists for Slovenia
Universiade silver medalists for Slovenia
Competitors at the 1997 Winter Universiade
Competitors at the 1999 Winter Universiade